Draft 258 is a 1917 American silent drama film directed by Christy Cabanne. It stars Mabel Taliaferro, Walter Miller, and Earl Brunswick, and was released on November 15, 1917.

Cast list

Preservation
With no prints of Draft 258 located in any film archives, it is a lost film.

References

External links

Metro Pictures films
Films directed by Christy Cabanne
American silent feature films
American black-and-white films
Silent American drama films
1917 drama films
1917 films
1910s American films